The Society for Marine Mammalogy was founded in 1981 and is the largest international association of marine mammal scientists in the world.

Mission
The mission of the Society for Marine Mammalogy (SMM) is to promote the global advancement of marine mammal science and contribute to its relevance and impact in education, conservation and management.

Objectives

 Evaluate and promote the educational, scientific and managerial advancement of marine mammal science.
 Gather and disseminate to members of the Society, the public, and public and private institutions, scientific, technical and management information through publications and meetings.
 Provide scientific information, as required, on matters related to the conservation and management of marine mammal resources.

History

The Biennial Conferences on the Biology of Marine Mammals predate the founding of the Society. The Biennial Conferences were a successor to Tom Poulter's "Annual Conference on Biological Sonar and Diving Mammals" held at the Stanford Research Institute (formally separated from Stanford University in 1970 and now known as SRI International) in Menlo Park, California, beginning in 1964. Dr. Ken Norris founded the First Biennial Conference on the Biology of Marine Mammals, hosted by UC Santa Cruz in 1975. About 300 people attended the conference. A second Biennial in San Diego followed in 1977, supported by the U.S. Naval Ocean Systems Center and about 480 people attended. Following the second conference, George Harry, then Director of what is now the National Marine Mammal Laboratory in Seattle, initiated discussions about forming a society to organize and run the conferences. In 1978, Ken Norris prepared a "Preliminary Design of a Society of Marine Mammalogy" and formed an organizational committee (consisting of Tom Dohl, George Harry, Burney LeBeouf, John C. Lilly, Ken Norris, Bill Perrin, Bill Powell and Forrest Wood, later expanded to include Bob Elsner, Bill Evans, Lou Herman and Ron Schusterman). The new society would "provide a vehicle for promoting the science of marine mammalogy." Proposed functions:

 Organize and sponsor regular meetings
 Sponsor workshops on special topics of interest
 Work to improve the quality of scientific work being done on marine mammals
 Provide for information exchange among marine mammalogists
 Provide a voice in social decision-making from the leadership in marine mammalogy
 Perhaps ultimately produce a journal for marine mammalogy and provide for its editorship

The committee met during the Third Biennial in Seattle in 1979 and discussed the preliminary design, proposed criteria for membership, and suggested by-laws. All was firmed up by correspondence, and at the Fourth Biennial in San Francisco in 1981, Ken presented the need and plans for a society to a meeting of those conference participants interested in forming one. The proposal was accepted by the group, and Ken was elected the first President by consensus. He then launched into the knotty tasks of confirming charter members, drafting a constitution and by-laws, getting the Society officially incorporated, recruiting people to act as interim Secretary, Treasurer and chairs of the committees on membership and nominations/elections, and helping start organization of the Fifth Biennial and the first full election. Attendance has grown from the 300 in 1975 to more than 2000 in some years.

The next major step for the Society after its formation in 1981 was the creation of a new journal devoted to the biology of marine mammals. Titles proposed included Journal of Marine Mammalogy, Marine Mammals, and others, but Marine Mammal Science won out. The first issue appeared in 1985. Joe Geraci was the first Editor, followed by Doug Wartzok, Bill Perrin, Don Bowen, Jim Estes and Daryl Boness (current). The first book-length special publication of the Society appeared in 1987 (Marine Mammal Energetics, edited by Huntley et al.), followed by The Bowhead Whale (1993, Burns et al., eds), Molecular Genetics of Marine Mammals (Dizon et al., eds) and Marine Mammals of the World (Rice, 1998).

Past Presidents

 D. Ann Pabst 2018-2020, USA
 Jay Barlow 2016-2018, USA
 Nick Gales 2014–2016, Australia
 Helene Marsh 2012-2014, Australia
 Randall S. Wells 2010-2012, USA
 Andrew J. Read 2008-2010, USA
 John E. Reynolds III 2006-2008, USA
 Kit M. Kovacs 2004-2006, Norway
 Paul Nachtigall 2002-2004, USA
 Daniel K. Odell 2000-2002, USA
 Douglas P. DeMaster 1998-2000, USA
 Ian Stirling 1996-1998, Canada
 Jeanette A. Thomas 1994-1996, USA
 Bernd Würsig 1992-1994, USA
 Christina Lockyer 1990-1992, United Kingdom
 Robert L. Brownell, Jr. 1989-1990, USA
 William F. Perrin 1987-1989, USA
 James G. Mead 1985-1987, USA
 Kenneth S. Norris (deceased) 1981-1985, USA

Conservation

The Society for Marine Mammalogy recognizes the numerous threats and challenges faced by marine mammals around the world. To address these issues of concern, the SMM employs three strategies:

 Presidential Letters which are sent to management bodies to encourage their efforts to sustain marine mammal populations.
 Society Resolutions which provide guidance to Society members and the general public on how to approach significant problems faced by marine mammals and their populations.
 Panel Discussions. Leading scientific experts with a range of skills and perspectives convene to educate members by discussing the science relevant to important and complex issues facing marine mammalogists.

Conferences

The Society for Marine Mammalogy holds international meetings every two years, with the goal of enhancing collaboration, sharing ideas, and improving the quality of research on marine mammals within the scientific community. The gathering of interdisciplinary experts enables discussion amongst marine mammal scientists and policy makers, enhancing collaboration and training the next generation of scientists and practitioners, and is a key opportunity to foster international partnerships and collaborations. In addition to key-note lectures and oral presentations, there are generally over 1,000 poster presentations in addition to topical workshops on hot topics in marine mammal science.

Forthcoming Conference

The Society for Marine Mammalogy holds biennial international meetings with the goal of enhancing collaboration, sharing ideas, and improving the quality of research on marine mammals within the scientific community. On December 13–17 2021, the Society for Marine Mammalogy will host its 24th Biennial Conference. The conference will take place in Palm Beach, Florida, USA. The meeting will bring together leaders in the field from every continent. The gathering of interdisciplinary experts enables discussion amongst marine mammal scientists and policy makers, enhancing collaboration and training the next generation of scientists and practitioners, and is a key opportunity to foster international partnerships and collaborations.

The conference will attract marine mammal scientists, managers and policy makers from more than 60 countries to engage in interdisciplinary dialogue on the world’s most pressing marine science and conservation issues as they relate to these highly charismatic species.

Past Conferences

 2019 - 23nd Biennial Conference - World Marine Mammal Conference, Barcelona, Spain, 9–12 December
 2017 - 22nd Biennial Conference, Halifax, Nova Scotia, Canada, 23–27 October
 2015 - 21st Biennial Conference, San Francisco, California, USA, 13–17 December
 2013 - 20th Biennial Conference, Dunedin, New Zealand, 9–13 December 
 2011 - 19th Biennial Conference, Tampa, Florida, USA, 26 November - 2 December 
 2009 - 18th Biennial Conference, Quebec City, Canada, 12–16 October
 2007 - 17th Biennial Conference, Cape Town, South Africa, 29 November - 3 December
 2005 - 16th Biennial Conference, San Diego, California, USA, 12–16 December
 2003 - 15th Biennial Conference, Greensboro, North Carolina, USA, 14–19 December 
 2001 - 14th Biennial Conference, Vancouver, British Columbia, Canada, 28 November - 3 December 
 1999 - 13th Biennial Conference, Maui, Hawaii, USA, 28 November - 3 December 
 1998 - 12th Biennial Conference - World Marine Mammal Science Conference, Monte Carlo, Monaco, 20–25 January 
 1995 - 11th Biennial Conference, Orlando, Florida, USA, 14–18 December 
 1993 - 10th Biennial Conference, Galveston, Texas, USA, 11–15 November 
 1991 - 9th Biennial Conference, Chicago, Illinois, USA, 5–9 December 
 1989 - 8th Biennial Conference, Pacific Grove, California, USA, 7–11 December 
 1987 - 7th Biennial Conference, Miami, Florida, USA, 5–9 December
 1985 - 6th Biennial Conference, Vancouver, British Columbia, Canada, 22–26 November
 1983 - 5th Biennial Conference, Boston, Massachusetts, USA, 27 November - 1 December
 1981 - 4th Biennial Conference, San Francisco, California, USA, 14–18 December
 1979 - 3rd Biennial Conference, Seattle, Washington, USA, 7–11 October
 1977 - 2nd Biennial Conference, San Diego, California, USA, 12–15 December 
 1975 - 1st Biennial Conference, Santa Cruz, California, USA, 4–7 December

Membership
As of 2019, the Society has over 1,800 members in 55 countries. About 55% of members reside in the USA.

Marine Mammal Science
The Society produces the scientific journal, Marine Mammal Science. Marine Mammal Science publishes significant new findings on marine mammals resulting from original research on their form and function, evolution, systematics, physiology, biochemistry, behavior, population biology, life history, genetics, ecology and conservation.

Notes

External links 

Marine Mammal Science - Journal Home- The Scientific publication of The Society for Marine Mammalogy

Oceanographic organizations
Organizations established in 1981
Scientific societies based in the United States
Mammalogy
Marine conservation
Cetology
Mammal conservation